Vicente Zito (24 November 1912 – 26 July 1989) was an Argentine footballer. He played in four matches for the Argentina national football team from 1933 to 1935. He was also part of Argentina's squad for the 1935 South American Championship.

References

External links
 

1912 births
1989 deaths
Argentine footballers
Argentina international footballers
Association football forwards
Quilmes Atlético Club footballers
Racing Club de Avellaneda footballers
Club Atlético Atlanta footballers